Abderrahim Achchakir (born December 15, 1986) is a Moroccan footballer who plays for Chabab Mohammedia and the Morocco national team. He was a member of the Morocco national team at the 2013 Africa Cup of Nations in South Africa.

Honors

Club
Raja Casablanca
Botola: 2019–20
Coupe du Trône: 2017 
CAF Confederation Cup: 2018, 2021
CAF Super Cup: 2019

References

1986 births
2013 Africa Cup of Nations players
Raja CA players
Difaâ Hassani El Jadidi players
AS FAR (football) players
Morocco international footballers
Moroccan footballers
Living people
People from Mohammedia
Association football defenders
SCC Mohammédia players
Morocco A' international footballers
2014 African Nations Championship players
2016 African Nations Championship players